Cock o' the Walk (Spanish: Yo soy gallo dondequiera!..) is a 1953 Mexican comedy film directed by Roberto Rodríguez and starring Sara Montiel, Joaquín Cordero and Freddy Fernández.

Cast
   Sara Montiel as Rosalia  
 Joaquín Cordero  as Jimmy; Joaquín  
 Freddy Fernández as Juanito  
 Julio Villarreal  as don Plutarco  
 Marco de Carlo as Felipe  
 Alicia Rodríguez as Lupe  
 Salvador Quiroz  as don Pedro, presidente municipal  
 Roberto Meyer as Licenciado Ruvalcaba  
 Alejandro Parodi as Alejandro 
 Lidia Franco as Pueblerina  
 Rafael Icardo as Cura  
 Cecilia Leger as Clienta de Jimmy  
 José Pardavé as Pueblerino 
 Hernán Vera as Cantinero

References

Bibliography 
 María Luisa Amador. Cartelera cinematográfica, 1950-1959. UNAM, 1985.

External links 
 

1953 films
1953 comedy films
Mexican comedy films
1950s Spanish-language films
Films directed by Roberto Rodríguez
Mexican black-and-white films
1950s Mexican films